Saga is a biannual peer-reviewed academic journal covering the history of Iceland. It is the official publication of the Icelandic Historical Society, Sögufélag. The journal was established in 1949 and has since then been the journal of choice for historians of Iceland.

All articles in Saga are subject to a double blind peer-review. Articles in Saga are written in Icelandic but accompanied by an English abstract.

The editors of Saga are historians Kristín Svava Tómasdóttir and Vilhelm Vilhelmsson.

References

External links
Saga archive

Publications established in 1949
European history journals
1949 establishments in Iceland
Icelandic-language mass media
History of Iceland